A by-election was held in the Niger constituency of the French National Assembly on 27 June 1948, after the territory was given a second seat in the Assembly. The result was a victory for Georges Condat of the Union of Nigerien Independents and Sympathisers.

Results

References

Niger
By-election
Elections in Niger
By-elections to the National Assembly (France)
Election and referendum articles with incomplete results
Niger by-election